As Long As You Want This is the first studio album by the Dutch rock group Kane, released in 2000.

Production process 

Before Kane recorded the album they released only one single in 1999 called Where Do I Go Now, which became a minor hit thanks to TMF (a Dutch music television station) and 3FM (a Dutch radio station). In October 1999 they went into a recording studio to record 'As Long As You Want This'. The CD was recorded at 'The Wisseloord Studios' in Hilversum and in 'Studio Arnold Mühren' in Volendam. The album was produced by producers duo Haro Slok & Henk Jan Smits, together with Woesthoff.

Reception 

As Long As You Want This was preceded by the single 'Where Do I Go Now'. The single peaked at #29 in the Dutch Top 40. The album nevertheless peaked at #2 in the Dutch Album Top 100. The album sold 40.000 copies in its first two months after the release date. Until now about 250.000 copies were sold in the Netherlands, making it 2 times Platinum. In 2001 they received an Edison award for this album.

Track listing

Personnel
Adapted from the album liner notes.

Kane
Tony Cornelissen – guitars, background vocals
Cyril Directie – drums, percussion
Aram Kersbergen – bass guitar
Dennis Van Leeuwen – guitars
Dinand Woesthoff – lead vocals, guitars

Additional musicians
Hans Eijkenaar — drums
Tjeerd Van Zanen — guitars
Nico Brandsen — hammond organ
Jan Teksta — backing vocals
Lodewijk Van Gorp;— backing vocals
Simone Roerade — backing vocals
Derdre Twist — backing vocals
A.P.C De Ruiter — violin leader
E.A. Korthals Altes — violin
P. Terlouw - violin
C.F.W. Dumessie — violin
M.H. Honingh — viola
J.A. Jowett — viola
A. Versloot — viola
A. Davidson — cello
O. Groesz — cello
E. Winkelman — double bass
Marcel Doesburg — didgeridoo
Haro Slok — wurlitzer, synthesizer and shakes
Henk Jan Smits — supershakes
Tom Bakker – string arrangements

Production
Haro Slok — co-producer
Henk Jan Smits — co-producer
Dinand Woesthoff — co-producer
Ronald Prent — co-mixer
Tom Janssen — co-mixer
René Schardt — mastering
Patrick Mühren — recording engineer
Tjeerd Van Zanen — recording engineer
Tijmen Zinkhaan — recording engineer

References

Kane (Dutch band) albums
2000 albums